Maria Luisa Berti (born 6 October 1971) is a Sammarinese politician who is one of two Captains Regent (heads of government for San Marino) in office since 1 October 2022. Serving alongside Manuel Ciavatta, it is her second term in office. Eleven years prior, she was in the same post for the April to October 2011 political term. Back then, it was shared with Filippo Tamagnini.

External links
April-October 2011 election information (in Italian)

1971 births
Captains Regent of San Marino
Members of the Grand and General Council
Female heads of state
Living people
Sammarinese Christian Democratic Party politicians
University of Urbino alumni